Miriam Arlene Stockley (born 15 April 1962) is a British singer. She was born in Johannesburg, South Africa, and her work is influenced by the African music of her home country. Her distinctive vocalise style gained international acclaim when Karl Jenkins launched the Adiemus project with Adiemus: Songs of Sanctuary, with Stockley as the lead singer.

In 1992 she performed as a backing vocalist at The Freddie Mercury Tribute Concert, which was broadcast live to 1 billion people worldwide from the Old Wembley Stadium.

Early life
At the age of eleven, Stockley and her older sister Avril formed the group the Stockley Sisters and had a hit with a cover of Shocking Blue's "Venus" in 1976 on the South African Top 30, ten years before Bananarama's version. Later in her life, she moved to the United Kingdom, settling in London to further pursue her musical career. There, she contributed vocals to several albums and TV commercials.

Career

1970s
She formed part of 'Blush', a short-lived South African disco act consisting of Stockley herself, Malie Kelly and guitarist Mike Pilot.

1980–1999
During the late 1980s and early 1990s, Stockley worked as a session singer for the UK songwriting and production trio Stock, Aitken and Waterman, and appeared on tracks by Kylie Minogue, Jason Donovan and Sonia. Alongside fellow session singer Mae McKenna, Stockley is credited with being partly responsible for the distinctive Stock, Aitken and Waterman sound of the 1980s.

Stockley provided backing vocals for the United Kingdom's Eurovision Song Contest entry on several occasions, most notably with Emma in 1990 and for Katrina and the Waves when they won in Dublin in 1997.

In 1991, Stockley became a part of the dance group Praise whose single "Only You" reached number four in the UK Singles Chart. A year later, the band, with Stockley on vocals, released its second single, "Dream On". This failed to have the same success as their previous single and the band decided to call it a day. In 1995, she worked with Karl Jenkins as the multi-layered vocalist on his first Adiemus release, which also gave her broad international exposure in a Delta Air Lines television commercial and release on the album Pure Moods.

Stockley's song "Perfect Day," written by Colin Towns and also known as "Theme for the Lake District," was used as the theme song for the BBC children's programme The World of Peter Rabbit and Friends, which ran from 1992 to 1998. She has also appeared as a singer on several BBC Schools programmes, most notably Look and Read, and contributed to the soundtrack for the 1997 film One Night Stand.

2000s

Stockley is featured as a member of the choir for The Fellowship of the Ring. Her cover version of the Rose Royce song "Wishing on a Star", feature on The 10th Kingdom.

In 2004, Yamaha released Vocaloid software that allows people to synthetically create background vocals. One of the three available voices from the studio Zero-G released for the first edition of the software is based on material recorded by Stockley.

In December 2006, Stockley contributed as a solo vocalist and as a co-vocalist with Mike Oldfield at the German Night of the Proms tour, consisting of 18 concerts. She also released her third solo album, a collection of rearranged classical standards entitled Eternal, in 2006.

In 2006, she joined Richard Gannaway and Jay Oliver as a primary member of the world music group AO Music (also known as AO). She first appeared on the album "Twirl", released 17 February 2009 on the group's indie label Arcturian Gate (debuted on international music charts at No. 5). Twirl contained the song "On Jai Ya"; a piece composed as Olympic theme music (2008) at the request of the Beijing Olympic Committee. Ultimately, the song was not selected and later chosen as soundtrack music for the 2011 promotional trailer "Project Peace on Earth". Twirl was released to an international audience in 2009 with Stockley as the group's main vocalist.

In June 2009, she, Richard Gannaway and Jay Oliver composed and produced the song "Gaiya Lo Mane" as theme music for the Give Kids the World Foundation.

In February 2011 Arcturian Gate released the AO Music's third album ...and Love Rages on!, where Stockley's voice is joined by children's choral ensembles from Beijing, Tbilisi, Johannesburg, Asheville and Orlando (charted at No. 2 internationally and awarded Zone Music Reporter's "Best World Album of 2011"). With the release of "...and Love Rages on!", Miriam and AO Music aligned with HavServe under GlobalGiving to build sustainable villages for the children of Haiti who were displaced by an earthquake in 2010. On 28 March 2011, she was invited to give a private performance for the Education Without Borders International conference in Dubai.

In March 2013 the AO Music group released Hokulea, which charted #3 internationally and sustained top 20 ranking (Zone Music Reporter) for five consecutive months. With the release of "Hokulea" AO Music officially established themselves as 100% non-profit through AO Foundation International, supporting several world organizations that attend to disadvantaged children. Stockley was also credited on the Hokulea co-producer.

Personal life
Stockley is married to Rod Houison, and the couple live in Orlando, Florida, United States. They have two children, Carly Houison and Leigh Brandon Houison.

Discography

Solo albums 
 Miriam Stockley (1979)
 Miriam (1999)
 Second Nature (2006)
 Eternal (2007)

Band/ensemble albums 
 Adiemus I: Songs of Sanctuary (1995)
Adiemus II: Cantata Mundi (1996)
Adiemus III: Dances of Time (1998)
AO Music – Twirl (2009)
 AO Music – ...and Love Rages On! (2011)
 AO Music – Hokulea (2013)
 AO Music – Asha (2017)
 AO Music – Kutumba (2021)

Backing vocals and guest appearances 
 Billy Fury - The One and Only (1983)
 Hanoi Rocks – Back to Mystery City (1983; backing vocals on "Until I Get You")
 Nik Kershaw – Radio Musicola (1986)
 Roger Daltrey – Can't Wait to See the Movie (1987)
 Freddie Mercury & Montserrat Caballé – Barcelona (1988; backing vocals on "The Golden Boy")
 Elaine Paige – The Queen Album (1988)
 Alphaville – Romeos (1989)
 Sonia – Can't Forget You (1989)
 Brian May – Back to the Light (1992)
 Eloy – The Tides Return Forever (1994; backing vocals on "Company of Angels")
 Queen – Made in Heaven (1995)
 Mike Oldfield – The Art in Heaven Concert (2000; backing vocals; lead vocal on "Moonlight Shadow")
 Atlantis vs Avatar – "Fiji" (2000; lead vocals)
 The Fellowship of the Ring soundtrack (2001; choir member)
 Queen: The Freddie Mercury Tribute Concert DVD (2002)
 Skylanders: Spyro's Adventure (video game, 2011)
 Bonnie Tyler – Between the Earth and the Stars (2019)
 Bonnie Tyler – The Best Is Yet to Come (2021)

2021 Back up vocal
"On my knees" Rufus Du Sol

References

External links
 
 Aomusic website
 Official German Nokia - Night of the proms Website
 Inferno Records

21st-century British women singers
1962 births
Living people
People from Johannesburg
South African expatriates in the United Kingdom
Musicians from Orlando, Florida
20th-century South African women singers
South African classical musicians
Vocaloid voice providers
New-age musicians
South African pop singers